John Joseph Francis Mulhall (October 7, 1887 – June 1, 1979) was an American film actor beginning in the silent film era who successfully transitioned to sound films, appearing in over 430 films in a career spanning 50 years.

Early years
Mulhall was born in Wappingers Falls, New York. He was one of six children born to an Irish father and a Scottish mother. He began helping with carnival acts when he was 14 years old.

Career
Before acting in films, Mulhall worked in legitimate theater, musical comedy, and vaudeville. He also worked as a model for magazine illustrators. His first film appearance (other than as an extra) was in The Fugitive (1910).

During the silent era, Mulhall was a popular screen player, particularly in the 1920s, and he starred in such films as The Social Buccaneer, The Mad Whirl and We Moderns. Some of his more prominent mid-career roles were in The Three Musketeers (1933), Burn 'Em Up Barnes (1934) and The Clutching Hand (1936). He last appeared in a film in 1959 (The Atomic Submarine).

In the late 1940s, Mulhall joined Blackouts, a stage revue produced by Ken Murray. After that production ended in 1949, he went on to appear on television programs in the 1950s. His last television appearance was on 77 Sunset Strip.

After he left acting, Mulhall worked for the Screen Actors Guild as a contract negotiator until 1974.

Personal life
During the peak of his success in films, Mulhall bought "large land holdings in what is now Sherman Oaks in the San Fernando Valley." However, losses in the Great Depression wiped out his fortune.

Mulhall's first wife was Bertha Vuillot, who died soon after they wed. His second wife, Laura Brunton, committed suicide in 1921. Later in 1921, he married Evelyn Winans. They remained married until his death in 1979.

Death
In 1979, Mulhall died from congestive heart failure at the Motion Picture & Television Country House and Hospital in Woodland Hills, California. He was 91. He was buried in Holy Cross Cemetery in Culver City, California.

Recognition
For his contributions to the motion picture industry, Mulhall received a star on the Hollywood Walk of Fame at 1724 Vine Street. It was dedicated on February 8, 1960.

Filmography

1910
The Fugitive (Short) as New Boy Friend
Sunshine Sue (Short) as Piano Store Employee
A Child's Stratagem (Short) as In Office

1913
The House of Discord (Short)

1914
Strongheart (Short) as In Stadium Crowd
Who's Looney Now? (Short)
The Fall of Muscle-Bound Hicks (Short) as Harry
They Called It 'Baby''' (Short) as 1st PolicemanThe Broken Rose (Short) as Dick Guild - as an AdultAll for Business (Short) as The Broker's SecretaryA Better Understanding (Short) as The Young ComposerBlacksmith Ben (Short)Little Miss Make-Believe (Short) as The BachelorFor Her People (Short) as The Young Art StudentThe Suffering of Susan (Short) as Pupil

1915All for the Boy (Short) as The BoyThe Gang's New Member (Short) as The Cub ReporterTheir Divorce Suit (Short) as The HusbandRose o' the Shore (Short) as Rose's 1st SuitorHis Brother's Keeper (Short) as Jack - 2nd BrotherThe Bridge Across (Short) as The Northern BoyThe Girl and the Matinee Idol (Short) as The Girl's SuitorOne Hundred Dollars (Short) as Billy Harvey - the HusbandWhen Hearts Are Young (Short) as Jack PrenticeHis Poor Little Girl (Short) as The Poor Girl's SweetheartA Much-Needed Lesson (Short) as The Young HusbandThe Little Scapegoat (Short) as Jack - the BachelorBobby's Bargain (Short) as Bobby's FatherHis Ward's Scheme (Short) as The Ward's SweetheartThe Girl Hater (Short) as John Morgan - Ralph's SonLove's Melody (Short) as The Young ActorThe Little Runaways (Short) as Mr. HiltonA Letter to Daddy (Short) as Young TownsendThe Fixer (Short) as JackThe Little Slavey (Short) as The Crook's Young PalHis Last Wish (Short) as McGraw - the Doctor's SonThe Need of Money (Short) as The Young LaborerDora (Short) as William AllenAt the Road's End (Short) as The BoyA Kentucky Episode (Short) as Jack BensonThe Girl Who Didn't Forget (Short) as The Grocery ClerkArline's Chauffeur (Short) as The ChauffeurHarvest (Short)The Sheriff's Trap (Short) as The Widow's SonWoman Without a Soul (Short) as CliftonHer Stepchildren (Short) as FrankThe Tides of Retribution (Short) as Jim Carpenter

1916The Avenging Shot (Short)The Skating Rink (Short)Stronger Than Woman's Will (Short)The Chain of Evidence (Short)The Iron Will (Short) as KalamonThe Guilt of Stephen Eldridge (Short) as Douglas GordonThe Mystery of Orcival (Short) as M. Plantat - Justice of the PeaceThe Rejuvenation of Aunt Mary (Short) as CloverAlias Jimmy Barton (Short) as Chester RandolphThe Man Who Called After Dark (Short) as Robert WhitmoreCeleste (Short) as The TouristA Spring Chicken (Short) as Farmer ChickweedMerry Mary (Short) as Brannigan - the LunaticThe Crimson Yoke (Short) as CasimirThe Whirlpool of Destiny as George BellWanted: A Home as Dr. PrineThe Place Beyond the Winds as Dick TraversThe Eyes of Love (Short) as RobertThe Price of Silence as Ralph Kelton

1917
 Fighting for Love as JimLove Aflame as Jack CalvertThe Terror as Chuck ConnellyThe Saintly Sinner as George Barnes
 Mr. Dolan of New York as Jimmy DolanHer Primitive Man (Short) as WadsworthThe Hero of the Hour as Billy BrooksThe Gunman's Gospel (Short) as Harry DonovanThe Flame of Youth as Jimmy GordonThree Women of France (Short) as Raoul RenfretHigh Speed as 'Speed' CannonThe Midnight Man as Bob MooreSirens of the Sea as Gerald Waldron

1918The Grand Passion as Jack RipleyThe Flames of Chance as Harry LedyardMadame Spy as Robert WesleyWild Youth as Orlando GuiseThe Whispering Chorus as Priest (uncredited)The Brass Bullet as Jack JamesDanger, Go Slow as Jimmy, the Eel

1919Don't Change Your Husband as Member of Gambling Club (uncredited)Creaking Stairs as Fred MillardWhom the Gods Would Destroy as Jack RandallFools and Their Money as Richard TompkinsThe Solitary Sin as BobA Favor To A Friend as Robert GarrisonThe Spite Bride as Rodney DolsonThe Merry-Go-Round as Jack HamiltonShould a Woman Tell? as Albert Tuley

1920All of a Sudden Peggy as Honorable Jimmy KeppelMiss Hobbs as Percy HackettThe Hope as Harold, Lord IngestreYou Never Can Tell as Prince

1921The Off-Shore Pirate as Toby MorelandThe Little Clown as Dick BeverleyTwo Weeks with Pay as J. Livingston SmithThe Ne'er to Return Road (Short) as The StrangerMolly O' as Dr. John S. BryantSleeping Acres (Short)

1922The Fourteenth Lover as Richard HardyTurn To The Right as Joe BascomMidnight as Jack DartThe Sleepwalker as Phillip CarruthersFlesh and Blood as Ted BurtonDusk to Dawn as Philip RandallThe White and Yellow (Short) as Charley Le GrantThe Channel Raiders (Short) as Charley Le GrantBroad Daylight as Joel MorganThe Forgotten Law as Victor JarnettePirates of the Deep (Short) as Charley Le GrantThe Law of the Sea (Short) as Charley Le GrantThe Siege of the Lancashire Queen (Short) as Charley Le GrantHeroes of the Street as Howard Lane

1923Dangerous Waters (Short) as Charley Le GrantThe Social Buccaneer as Jack NortonThe Yellow Handkerchief (Short) as Charley Le GrantThe Wolves of the Waterfront (Short) as Charley Le GrantWithin the Law as Richard Gilder - his sonDulcy as Gordon SmithThe Call of the Wild as John ThorntonThe Bad Man as Gilbert JonesThe Marriage Market as Roland CarruthersThe Drums of Jeopardy as Jerome Hawksley

1924The Goldfish as Jimmy WetherbyInto the Net as Robert 'Bob' ClaytonThe Breath of Scandal as Bill WallaceThe Folly of Vanity as Robert (modern sequence)The Naked Truth1925Three Keys as Jack MillingtonThe Mad Whirl as Jack HerringtonFriendly Enemies as William PfeifferShe Wolves as Lucien 'D'ArtoisWild West as Jimmy WhitehawkClassified as Lloyd WhitingWe Moderns as John AshlerJoanna as John Wilmore

1926Pleasures of the Rich as Dick ClaytonThe Far Cry as Frank ClaytonThe Dixie Merchant as Jimmy PickettSilence as Arthur LawrenceSweet Daddies as Jimmy O'BrienSubway Sadie as Herb McCarthyGod Gave Me Twenty Cents as Steve DorenJust Another Blonde as Jimmy O'Connor

1927Orchids and Ermine as Richard TaborSee You in Jail as Jerry MarsdenThe Poor Nut as John 'Jack' MillerSmile, Brother, Smile as Jack LoweryThe Crystal Cup as Geoffrey PelhamMan Crazy as Jeffery Pell

1928Ladies' Night in a Turkish Bath as 'Speed' DawsonLady Be Good as Jack
 The Butter and Egg Man as Peter JonesWaterfront as Jack DowlingNaughty Baby as Terry Vandeveer

1929Children of the Ritz as Dewey HainesTwo Weeks Off as Dave PickettTwin Beds as Danny BrownDark Streets as Pat McGlone / Danny McGloneThe Show of Shows as Performer in '$20 Bet' Sketch and 'Bicycle Built for Two' Number

1930Second Choice as Owen MalleryIn the Next Room as James GodfreyThe Golden Calf as Philip HomerMurder Will Out as Leonard StauntonShowgirl in Hollywood as Jimmie DoyleThe Fall Guy as Johnny QuinlanRoad to Paradise as George WellsFor the Love o' Lil as Wyn HuntleyReaching for the Moon as Jimmy Carrington

1931Lover Come Back as Tom EvansNight Beat as Johnny Molinas

1932Sally of the Subway as Grand Duke Ludwig of Saxe-ThalbergMurder at Dawn as DannySinister Hands as Detective Capt. Herbert DevlinLove Bound as Richard 'Dick' Randolph, posing as Dick RowlandPassport to Paradise as BobHell's Headquarters as Ross King

1933The Three Musketeers (Serial) as ClancyCurtain at Eight as Carey WeldonSecret Sinners as Jeff GilbertThe Mystery Squadron as Henry 'Hank' Davis

1934Many Happy Returns as ActorBurn 'Em Up Barnes as 'Burn-'em-Up' BarnesWhom the Gods Destroy as Godfrey Elliot (uncredited)The Old Fashioned Way as Dick BronsonThe Notorious Sophie Lang as Jewelry ClerkThe Human Side as Actor (uncredited)Cleopatra as Roman Greeting Antony (uncredited)Evelyn Prentice as Gregory (uncredited)It's a Gift as Butler (uncredited)Broadway Bill (uncredited)Bandits and Ballads (Short)Behold My Wife as Reporter at Train (uncredited)One Hour Late as Whittaker (uncredited)

1935The Woman in Red as Mr. Crozier, Seated Guest on Yacht (uncredited)I've Been Around as Minor RoleMississippi as Duelist (uncredited)Straight from the Heart as Reporter (uncredited)George White's 1935 Scandals as Theater Ticket Seller (uncredited)Wig-Wag (Short) as Jack WinchellRoaring Roads as Donald McDowellThe Fighting Lady as George DavisReckless as Paul's Restrainer in Bar (uncredited)Love in Bloom as Beggar (uncredited)The Informer as Man at Wake (uncredited)The Headline Woman as Police Sgt. BlairPeople Will Talk as Sam Baxter (uncredited)What Price Crime? as HopkinsParis in Spring as George, Cafe Simone DoormanChinatown Squad as Desk Clerk - St. Francis Hotel (uncredited)Pickled Peppers (Short)The Glass Key (uncredited)Love Me Forever as Gambler (scenes deleted)Men Without Names as Reporter (uncredited)Lady Tubbs as Stevens - Hotel Clerk (uncredited)Here's to Romance as Secretary (uncredited)Here Comes the Band as Soldier (scenes deleted)Page Miss Glory as Reporter (uncredited)Two for Tonight as Gordon's Doctor (uncredited)The Gay Deception as Bank Teller (uncredited)The Big Broadcast of 1936 as Radio Executive (uncredited)His Night Out as SalesmanThe Last Days of Pompeii as Citizen of Pompeii (uncredited)Your Uncle Dudley as Advertising Man (uncredited)Skull and Crown as EdThe Shadow of Silk Lennox as Ferguson, alias 'Fingers' Farley

1936Custer's Last Stand as Lieutenant CookStrike Me Pink as Stagedoor Johnny (uncredited)Anything Goes as Purser (uncredited)A Face in the Fog as ReardonKlondike Annie as Officer (uncredited)Preview Murder Mystery as Jack RawlinsWife vs. Secretary as Howard - Party Guest (uncredited)The Clutching Hand as Craig KennedyThe Country Beyond as Mountie (uncredited)Thirteen Hours by Air as Horace Lander - Reservations ClerkOne Rainy Afternoon as Ice Rink Announcer (uncredited)Show Boat as Race Fan (uncredited)Undersea Kingdom (Serial) as Lt. Andrews [Chs. 1, 12]The Rogues Tavern as BillThe Last Outlaw as Card Player (uncredited)The Crime of Dr. Forbes as Pinkey (uncredited)Kelly of the Secret Service as George LessermanCharlie Chan at the Race Track as Second Purser (uncredited)Hollywood Boulevard as Jack Mulhall - Actor at Trocadero BarStraight from the Shoulder as Reporter (uncredited)Wives Never Know as Scout (uncredited)Murder with Pictures as Girard Henchman (uncredited)The Big Broadcast of 1937 as ClerkWedding Present as Reporter (uncredited)Libeled Lady as Barker (uncredited)Without Orders as Jake - the Airport Guard (uncredited)Under Your Spell as Court Clerk (uncredited)Beloved Enemy as Casey

1937Secret Valley as Lawyer James ParkerLove Is News as Yacht Salesman (uncredited)History Is Made at Night as Waiter (uncredited)Internes Can't Take Money as First Mug (uncredited)Wings Over Honolulu as Officer (uncredited)Armored Car as Manny (uncredited)Dangerous Holiday as Police SergeantBorn Reckless as Kane's Co-Driver (uncredited)Topper as Irate Nightclub Patron (uncredited)The Toast of New York as Broker (uncredited)One Hundred Men and a Girl as RudolphThe Boss Didn't Say Good Morning (Short) as John Jones (uncredited)Framing Youth (Short) as Radio AnnouncerSky Racket as Henchman MeggsRadio Patrol (Serial) as Desk SergeantMusic for Madame as Wedding Guest (uncredited)Saturday's Heroes as Hotel Desk Clerk (uncredited)Amateur Crook as Jan JaffinTim Tyler's Luck (Serial) as Sgt. Gates

1938The Spy Ring as Capt. Tex RandolphOf Human Hearts as Soldier Holding Pilgrim - the Horse (uncredited)Mad About Music as Reporter (uncredited)Flash Gordon's Trip to Mars (Serial) as Bomber Captain [Chs. 4-5, 13]Outlaws of Sonora as Dr. George MartinYou and Me as First Floorwalker (uncredited)Held for Ransom as MorrisonCrime Ring as Detective Brady (uncredited)The Chaser as Joe, Brandon HenchmanThe Gladiator as Spectator at Wrestling Match (uncredited)Swing That Cheer as Manager (uncredited)Young Dr. Kildare as Intern (uncredited)The Storm as Harry Blake - Wireless OperatorSharpshooters as Photographer (uncredited)While New York Sleeps as Reporter (uncredited)

1939Dodge City (uncredited)Scouts to the Rescue (Serial) as Scoutmaster Hale [Ch. 1]Home on the Prairie as Dr. SommersMade for Each Other as Rock Springs Radio Operator (uncredited)Three Smart Girls Grow Up as Butler (uncredited)Buck Rogers (Serial) as Captain RankinOutlaws' Paradise as Prison WardenIt's a Wonderful World as Reporter with Vivian (uncredited)6000 Enemies as Prisoner O'Toole (uncredited)First Love as TerryJoe and Ethel Turp Call on the President as Policeman (uncredited)Judge Hardy and Son as Interne (uncredited)

1940That Inferior Feeling (Short) as Bank Teller (uncredited)Broadway Melody of 1940 as George (uncredited)The Heckler (Short) (voice, uncredited)Black Friday as BartenderStrange Cargo as Dunning (uncredited)Grandpa Goes to Town (uncredited)A Failure at Fifty (Short) as Partner (uncredited)I Love You Again as Worker Saying 'Seventy Hours . . .' (uncredited)Comin' Round the Mountain as Salesman (uncredited)The Golden Fleecing as Reporter (uncredited)Strike Up the Band as Man Phoning in Contest Winner (uncredited)Dulcy as Businessman in Meeting (uncredited)A Little Bit of Heaven as Policeman (uncredited)Third Finger, Left Hand as Niagara Falls Guide (uncredited)The Quarterback as Doctor (uncredited)The Son of Monte Cristo as SchmidtMysterious Doctor Satan (Serial) as Police Chief Rand [Chs. 1, 4, 13]

1941Cheers for Miss Bishop as Professor CarterCaught in the Act (uncredited)Buck Privates as Medical Examiner (uncredited)Back Street as Mr. White (uncredited)Ride, Kelly, Ride as Jockey Agent (uncredited)Las Vegas Nights (Serial) as Croupier (uncredited)Adventures of Captain Marvel as James Howell [Ch. 1]Federal FugitivesInvisible Ghost as TimThe Spider Returns (Serial) as Detective Farrell [Chs. 13, 14, 15] (uncredited)Love Crazy as Court Clerk (uncredited)In the Navy as Lt. Scott (uncredited)Desperate Cargo as Jim HalseyBowery Blitzkrieg as Officer SherrillSaddle Mountain Roundup as FreemanDangerous Lady as Jones - the Hotel ClerkUnexpected Uncle as Policeman at Kathleen's Apartment (uncredited)It Started with Eve as Nightclub Photographer (uncredited)Sea Raiders (Serial) as 'Dolphin' Radioman [Chs. 1-2] (uncredited)International Lady as Desk ClerkHard Guy as Tex CassidyAppointment for Love as Reporter (uncredited)I Killed That Man as CollinsHarvard, Here I Come! as Reporter (uncredited)Dick Tracy vs. Crime Inc. (Serial) as Jim Wilson

1942Freckles Comes Home (scenes deleted)Treat 'Em Rough as WaiterMan from Headquarters as Whalen, ReporterMr. Wise Guy as Jim BarnesThe Dawn Express as Chief Agent James CurtisGang Busters (Serial) as Richards - Police Lab Tech. [Chs. 9, 11] (uncredited)A Gentleman After Dark as Desk clerkSo's Your Aunt Emma as BurnsTop Sergeant as Captain Ordering Bridge Blown Up (uncredited)Wake Island as Dr. Parkman (uncredited)Between Us Girls as Nightclub Waiter (uncredited)The Glass Key as Lynch (uncredited)Sin Town as HansonForeign Agent as Steve, EditorThe Forest Rangers as Lookout (uncredited)'Neath Brooklyn Bridge as SergeantQueen of Broadway as Bookie

1943Silent Witness as Police Officer Jed KellyKid Dynamite as Clancy - Second AbductorThe Amazing Mrs. Holliday as Reporter (uncredited)The Ape Man as ReporterIdaho as Board Member (uncredited)I Escaped from the Gestapo as Police Dispatcher (uncredited)Cowboy in Manhattan as HeadwaiterColt Comrades as Postmaster (uncredited)Hers to Hold as Officer (uncredited)The Falcon in Danger as Casino Manager (uncredited)Ghosts on the Loose as LieutenantSwing Shift Maisie as Doctor (uncredited)The Kansan as Walter (uncredited)Corvette K-225 as Officer (uncredited)Hi'ya, Sailor as Police LieutenantWhistling in Brooklyn as Reporter (uncredited)Wedtime Stories1944Lady in the Dark as Photographer (uncredited)Gambler's Choice as Harry (uncredited)South of Dixie as Newspaper PhotographerBabes on Swing Street as Cop (uncredited)National Barn Dance as Radio Man (uncredited)A Wave, a WAC and a Marine as BartenderAn American Romance as Customer (uncredited)My Buddy as Announcer at Convicts' Show (uncredited)Bowery Champs as Sgt. Ryan (uncredited)

1945The Man Who Walked Alone as Policeman #1Dillinger as Police Officer (uncredited)The Phantom of 42nd Street as Lt. WalshFlame of Barbary Coast as Gambler (uncredited)

1946The Searching Wind as Reporter (uncredited)Deadline for Murder as 2nd Player (uncredited)Monsieur Beaucaire as Guard (uncredited)'Neath Canadian Skies (Short) as InspectorNorth of the Border (Short) as Inspector Swanson

1948Lulu Belle as Policeman (uncredited)

1949You're My Everything as Suitor in 'Flaming Flappers' (uncredited)Sky Liner as Col. HansonMy Friend Irma as Photographer (uncredited)

1952Chained for Life as Dr. ThompsonBlackhawk (Serial) as Defense Council Member [Chs. 7-8] (uncredited)Just for You as Major (uncredited)Ellis in Freedomland as Male Model

1955Tennessee's Partner as Townsman (uncredited)The Man with the Golden Arm as Turnkey (uncredited)

1956The She Creature as Lombardi's LawyerCalling Homicide as Deputy Pierson (uncredited)Around the World in 80 Days as Minor Role (uncredited)

1957Up in Smoke as Police Clerk

1958In the Money (scenes deleted)I Married a Woman as Old Cop (uncredited)

1959The Atomic Submarine'' as Justin Murdock (final film role)

References

External links

Jack Mulhall at Virtual History

1887 births
1979 deaths
American male film actors
American male silent film actors
Male film serial actors
Male actors from New York (state)
People from Wappingers Falls, New York
20th-century American male actors